The  Kansas City Chiefs season was the franchise's 14th season in the National Football League and the 24th overall. They matched on their 6–10 record and last place finish in the AFC West.

The Chiefs fired head coach Marv Levy on January 4 after compiling a 31–42 record. Dallas Cowboys quarterbacks coach John Mackovic was named the fifth head coach in team history on February 2. The 39-year-old Mackovic became the youngest individual ever to hold that post for the club. The Chiefs held the seventh overall pick in the 1983 NFL Draft and selected quarterback Todd Blackledge. The Chiefs would not draft another quarterback in the first round until the 2017 NFL Draft when they drafted Patrick Mahomes.

Tragedy struck the Chiefs on June 29 when Joe Delaney drowned while attempting to save the lives of three children in Monroe, Louisiana. Delaney was posthumously awarded the Presidential Citizen's Medal by Ronald Reagan on July 13. Linebacker Bobby Bell became the first Chiefs player to be inducted into the Pro Football Hall of Fame on July 30, providing some solace for the mourning Chiefs fan base following Joe Delaney's death.

With Bill Kenney and Todd Blackledge both on the roster, starting Steve Fuller was traded to the Los Angeles Rams on August 19. Kenney earned a Pro Bowl berth after racking up a franchise-record 4,348 passing yards, while wide receiver Carlos Carson hauled in 80 passes for 1,351 yards. Despite the team's high-flying passing game, head coach John Mackovic had trouble finding a suitable replacement for Joe Delaney and the running back position. The highest scoring contest in franchise history took place as the Chiefs and Seattle Seahawks combined for 99 points in a wild, 51–48 overtime loss at the Kingdome. A meager crowd of 11,377 braved near-zero degree temperatures to attend the club's season-ending 48–17 win against Denver on December 18, the smallest attendance figure ever for a Chiefs game at Arrowhead as the club finished the year at 6–10.

NFL Draft

Personnel

Staff

Roster

Schedule

Preseason

Regular season 

Note: Intra-division opponents are in bold text.

Game summaries

Week 1: vs. Seattle Seahawks

Week 2: vs. San Diego Chargers

Week 3: at Washington Redskins

Week 4: at Miami Dolphins

Week 5: vs. St. Louis Cardinals

Week 6: at Los Angeles Raiders

Week 7: vs. New York Giants

Week 8: at Houston Oilers

Week 9: at Denver Broncos

Week 10: vs. Los Angeles Raiders

Week 11: vs. Cincinnati Bengals

Week 12: at Dallas Cowboys

Week 13: at Seattle Seahawks

Week 14: vs. Buffalo Bills

Week 15: at San Diego Chargers

Week 16: vs. Denver Broncos

Standings

References

External links 
 1983 Kansas City Chiefs at Pro-Football-Reference.com

Kansas City Chiefs
Kansas City Chiefs seasons
Kansas